The Alpina B3 S is a series of high performance compact executive cars manufactured by German automobile manufacturer Alpina from 2002 to 2006 based on the Alpina B3 developed from the BMW 3 Series (E46). The B3 S was available in coupé, saloon, convertible and station wagon body styles. The B3 S was introduced at the 2002 Paris Motor Show.

Specifications 
The engine is a hand-built 3.4-litre E5/1 inline-6 unit, also shared with the Alpina Roadster S. The engine is an enlarged version of the S52B32 engine first installed in the North American M3 (E36). The engine has a red-line of 7,300 rpm. Modifications to the engine include an Alpina specific cylinder head, crankshaft and high strength MAHLE pistons.

The B3 S was available with a 5-speed Switch Tronic automatic transmission or a 6-speed manual transmission built by Getrag. Noticeable changes to the interior include Alpina logos and badges, Alpina door sills, and heated sports seats. The comforts options offered by BMW were included as standard in the interior. The exterior changes include a front chin spoiler, 18-inch Alpina alloy wheels wrapped in Michelin Pilot Sport tyres measuring 225/40 R18 on the front and 255/35 R18 on the rear, and "B3 S" badging at the rear. Changes to the suspension system consisted of Alpina specific dampers and Eibach springs with no other major changes.

References

B3S
Cars introduced in 2002
Rear-wheel-drive vehicles
Sports sedans
Wagons
Compact executive cars
Coupés
Convertibles